Daniele Lavia (born 4 November 1999) is an Italian volleyball player, a member of the Italy men's national volleyball team, participant of the 2020 Olympic Games.  On club level, he plays for Italian club Trentino Volley.

Sporting achievements

Clubs
 FIVB Club World Championship
  Betim 2021 – with Itas Trentino
  Betim 2022 – with Itas Trentino

 National championships
 2021/2022  Italian SuperCup, with Itas Trentino
 2022/2023  Italian Cup, with Itas Trentino

Youth national team
 2017  U19 European Championship
 2019  U21 World Championship

National team
 2021  CEV European Championship
 2022  FIVB World Championship

Individual
 2019: U21 World Championship – Best Outside Hitters
 2021: CEV European Championship – Best Outside Hitters

References

External links

1999 births
Living people
Italian men's volleyball players
Olympic volleyball players of Italy
Volleyball players at the 2020 Summer Olympics
Sportspeople from the Province of Cosenza
Outside hitters